Varuna Vidhan Sabha seat is one of the seats in Karnataka State Assembly in India. It is part of Chamarajanagar Lok Sabha seat. The constituency came into existence after 2008 delimitation exercise.

Members of Assembly 
 Before 2008 : The seat did not exist.

Election results

2008 Assembly Election
 Siddaramaiah (INC) : 71,908 votes    
 L. Revannasiddaiah (BJP) : 53,071

2013 Assembly Election
 Siddaramaiah (INC) : 84,385 votes    
 Kapu Siddalingaswamy (Karnataka Janatha Party) : 	54744

2018 Assembly Election
 Yathindra S (INC) : 96,435 votes  
 T Basavaraju (BJP) : 37,819 votes

See also 
 List of constituencies of Karnataka Legislative Assembly

References 

Assembly constituencies of Karnataka